The Crazy World of Arthur Brown are an English rock band formed by singer Arthur Brown in 1967. The original band included Vincent Crane (Hammond organ and piano), Drachen Theaker  (drums), and Nick Greenwood (bass). This early incarnation were noted for Crane's organ and brass arrangements and Brown's powerful, wide ranging operatic voice. Brown was also notable for his unique stage persona such as extreme facepaint and burning helmet.

Their song "Fire" (released in 1968 as a single) sold over one million copies, and was awarded a gold disc reaching number one in the UK Singles Chart and Canada, and number two on the US Billboard Hot 100 as well as its parent album The Crazy World of Arthur Brown which reached number 2 on the UK album charts and number 7 in the US.

In the late 1960s, the Crazy World of Arthur Brown's popularity was such that the group shared bills with the Who, Jimi Hendrix, the Mothers of Invention, the Doors, the Small Faces, and Joe Cocker, among others.

Following the success of the single "Fire", the press would often refer to Brown as "The God of Hellfire", in reference to the opening shouted line of the song, a moniker that exists to this day.

History
Brown quickly earned a reputation for his outlandish performances, including the use of a burning metal helmet, which led to occasional mishaps. During an early appearance at the Windsor Festival in 1967, Brown wore a colander on his head soaked in methanol. The fuel poured over his head by accident caught fire; two bystanders doused the flames by pouring beer on Brown’s head, preventing any serious injury. The flaming head then became an Arthur Brown signature. On occasion he also stripped naked while performing, most notably in Italy, where, after setting his hair on fire, he was arrested and deported. He was also notable for the extreme make-up he wore onstage, which would later be reflected in the stage acts of Alice Cooper, Peter Gabriel, George Clinton, and Bruce Dickinson among others.

By 1968, the debut album, The Crazy World of Arthur Brown became a hit on both sides of the Atlantic. Produced by The Who's manager Kit Lambert, with Pete Townshend credited as associate producer, on Track Records, the label begun by Lambert and Chris Stamp, it spun off an equally surprising hit single, "Fire", and contained a version of "I Put a Spell on You" written by Screaming Jay Hawkins, a similarly bizarre showman. "Fire" sold over one million copies, and was awarded a gold disc. The song has since seen its opening line "I am the God of Hellfire" sampled in numerous other places, most notably in The Prodigy's 1992 rave anthem "Fire", and more recently in Death Grips' "Lord of the Game", from 2011.

Theaker was replaced because of his aviophobia in 1968 by Chris Farlowe & The Thunderbirds drummer Carl Palmer (later of Atomic Rooster, Emerson, Lake & Palmer and Asia) for the band's second American tour in 1969, on which keyboardist Vincent Crane also left—although he soon returned. The band recorded a second album, titled Strangelands, intended for release in 1969 but shelved by their label over concerns that it lacked sales potential. The album featured a more experimental and avant-garde sound that shed the pop sensibilities of the Crazy World's debut. Strangelands was not issued until 1988.

The new lineup practically dissolved on the band's US tour in June 1969. Crane and Palmer left to form Atomic Rooster, Greenwood, known as Sean Nicholas during his time in the band, went on to Khan where he performed under the name Nick Greenwood. Theaker went to join Love and then Rustic Hinge, and Arthur Brown eventually joined Kingdom Come.

The band re-formed in 2000 and released Tantric Lover.

In 2013, as the result of a successful pledge campaign on PledgeMusic, the band released the album Zim Zam Zim, recorded in Brown's yurt in Lewes.

Musical style

The Crazy World of Arthur Brown's music encompasses psychedelic soul, British rhythm and blues, pop, and psychedelic rock.

Mike Knoop, writing for Classic Rock magazine, said that Brown's singing style recalls "Eric Burdon, Bob Calvert, Ian Gillan, Tim Curry, Brian Connolly, and a smidgen of King Diamond all coming out of one person." Brian Carr, another Classic Rock writer, compared the debut album's music to that of Alice Cooper and Frank Zappa.

Members
Current members
 Arthur Brown – lead vocals 
 Jim Mortimore – bass, backing vocals, guitars, electronics 
 Samuel Walker – drums, backing vocals, percussion 
 Dan Smith - guitar, Hammond MX-1 organ, electronics, vocals 

Additional personnel
 Andy Clark - content creator and visual show
 Robin O’Keefe - visuals, camera work, musician
 Angel Fallon - dance and choreography 
 Claire Waller - costumes and creative direction

Former members
 Sean Nicholas Greenwood – bass guitar 
 Vincent Crane – Hammond organ, piano 
 Drachen Theaker – drums 
 Carl Palmer – drums 
 Jeff Cutler – drums 
 Dick Heninghem – organ, piano 
 Pete Solley – organ, piano 
 Z-Star – guitar, keytar, keybass, percussion, vocals 
 Lucie Rejchrtova – keyboards, synthesizers 
 Malcolm Dick – projection

Timeline

Discography
Studio albums
1968: The Crazy World of Arthur Brown (#2 UK, #6 Can., #7 US)
1988: Strangelands (rejected second album recorded in 1969)
2000: Tantric Lover (CD, UK, Voiceprint Records)
2003: Vampire Suite (CD, UK, Track Records)
2013: Zim Zam Zim (released as the result of a pledge campaign)
2019: Gypsy Voodoo

Live albums
1993: Order From Chaos
2011: The Crazy World of Arthur Brown Live At High Voltage (vinyl only release, limited edition of 1000, recorded at the High Voltage Festival)

Singles

Music Videos

References

Bibliography

Marshall, Polly. The God of Hellfire, the Crazy Life and Times of Arthur Brown. SAF Publishing, 2005. .

External links
 

British rhythm and blues musical groups
British soul musical groups
English psychedelic rock music groups
Freak scene musicians
Atlantic Records artists
Zoho Music artists
Musical groups established in 1967
1967 establishments in England
Musical groups from London